Ghumkhahare  is a village development committee in Surkhet District in the Bheri Zone of mid-western Nepal. At the 1991 Nepal census, it had a population of 3906 people living in 631 individual households.

References

External links
UN map of the municipalities of Surkhet District

Populated places in Surkhet District